Manakara is a city in Madagascar.

It is the capital Fitovinany Region and of the district of Manakara Atsimo.

The city is located at the east coast near the mouth of the Manakara River and has a small port.

 The bridge over the Manakara River that connected the northern and southern parts of the city partly collapsed in September 2012.

Its temperature on average is 27 degrees Celsius, the high is 32 and low is 10.

Infrastructures

Railroad
It is the endpoint of the Fianarantsoa-Côte Est railway (FCE), which connects the city of Fianarantsoa with the sea. For those interested in traveling to Manakara via the railway, please be advised the train can take over 12 hours at times. It usually leaves Fianarantsoa at 7 in the morning, and is supposed to reach Manakara by 4 pm, but there have been incidences of it not reaching Manakara until much later. If one needs to return to the capital from Manakara and time is an issue, take a plane or a taxi-brousse (Taxi-Bus). There is also an airport and a national road along the coastline.

Roads
The National road 12, from  Irondro (North, 118km,  intersection with RN 25) - Manakara  to Farafangana (224 km, south) and Vangaindrano (299 km).

Airport
Manakara Airport is one of the few places where a railway crosses a runway. There are no commercial flights to Manakara.

Education
French international schools:
 École primaire française Les Pangalanes

References

External links 

Cities in Madagascar
Populated places in Fitovinany
Regional capitals in Madagascar